KTO is a French-language Catholic television channel. It is broadcast in France, Belgium, and Switzerland, as well as francophone countries in the Middle East and sub-Saharan Africa.

History
The channel was founded in 1999 by Jean-Marie Lustiger, who served as the Archbishop of Paris from 1981 to 2005. It is privately funded by 250,000 donors.

Programs have included documentaries about the Vatican and Christians in Iraq, as well as funny skits.

On 15 June 2019 KTO broadcast the first service live from Notre-Dame (in Paris) since the fire.

See also
Catholic television
Catholic television channels
Catholic television networks

References

External links
Official website

French-language television stations
Television channels and stations established in 1999
1999 establishments in France
Catholic television channels